Lulung is a tourist destination and entrance to Similipal National Park.It is situated in Kuchilaghati  Panchayat , Mayurbhanj District of Odisha in India.It is situated beside Palpala River.It's a good picnic spot , especially in winters. 
Lulung, is home to many endangered and endemic species of flora and fauna. Sometimes herds of elephants are also seen here.
It is very close to Baripada , about 15-20 kilometers. There is also one resort and a eco cottage facility available where one can stay very comfortably and enjoy every moment peacefully.

Tourist attractions in Odisha